Elizabeth of the United Kingdom (1926–2022) was Queen of the United Kingdom from 1952 until her death.

Elizabeth of the United Kingdom may also refer to:

* Elizabeth Bowes-Lyon (1900–2002), queen consort, queen dowager and queen mother of the United Kingdom
 Princess Elizabeth of the United Kingdom (1770–1840), third daughter of King George III

See also
 Elizabeth of England (disambiguation)
 Elizabeth the Queen Mother (disambiguation)
 Princess Elizabeth (disambiguation)
 Queen Elizabeth (disambiguation)